Patrick Aloysius O'Brien was a Scottish amateur football centre forward who played in the Scottish League for Queen's Park.

Personal life 
O'Brien had a wife, four sons and two daughters. He served as a captain in the Royal Army Medical Corps during the First World War and later became a casualty surgeon for the Glasgow Police. In May 1941, during the Second World War, O'Brien was called to examine Nazi Deputy Führer Rudolf Hess, who had landed near Eaglesham on an attempted peace mission.

Career statistics

References

1884 births
Scottish footballers
Scottish Football League players
British Army personnel of World War I
Association football forwards
Queen's Park F.C. players
Royal Army Medical Corps officers
Place of death missing
Date of death missing
Footballers from Glasgow
Scottish surgeons